Thomas Schmit (26 April 1895 – 9 August 1944) was a Luxembourgian footballer. He competed in the men's tournament at the 1920 Summer Olympics.

References

External links
 

1895 births
1944 deaths
Luxembourgian footballers
Luxembourg international footballers
Olympic footballers of Luxembourg
Footballers at the 1920 Summer Olympics
Sportspeople from Luxembourg City
Association football defenders